Eupithecia cazieri is a moth in the family Geometridae. It is found in Arizona.

The wingspan is about 14 mm. The forewings are grey, with weakly indicated grey-brown cross lines. The hindwings are grey with brown scaling in the region of the inner margin. Adults have been recorded on wing in March.

Etymology
The species is named in honor of Dr. Mont A. Cazier, Director of 
the Southwestern Research Station.

References

Moths described in 1961
cazieri
Moths of North America